Daniel Jan "Daan" Jippes (born 14 October 1945) is a Dutch cartoonist who's known for his work on Disney comics. In the 1980s and 1990s he drew many covers for Gladstone Publishing's Disney magazines. In the 1990s he redrew for Egmont old  Junior Woodchucks stories from the 1970s, originally written by Carl Barks and drawn by John Carey, Kay Wright and Tony Strobl.

Biography
Daan Jippes started his comics career in the Netherlands, where his work was published in the comics magazine Pep in the late 1960s and early 1970s. He rose to national recognition with his comics album Bernard Voorzichtig: Twee Voor Thee. In the mid seventies he started working for the Dutch Donald Duck magazine, where his interpretation of the ducks and Mickey Mouse drew the attention of the Disney Studios in Burbank, California. Subsequently he was hired and worked for the Disney company; initially for the comic strip and merchandising department, later for the animation department as a designer and storyboarder, contributing to such films as The Rescuers Down Under, The Prince and the Pauper, Beauty and the Beast and Aladdin. Aside from his work at Disney, he also worked as a storyboard supervisor on Amblimation's Balto and provided covers in Disney style for the comic books of Gladstone Publishing.

Back in the Netherlands, in 2006 Jippes started a new album series, based on the detective stories by Havank, drawn in a Marcinelle style similar to Franquin. Two albums have been published. In 2013 Jippes stated in an interview: "that project's dead in the water. Though I've finished writing a third story I lack the time and funding to start drawing and coloring those 44-plus pages."

Reprints

In 2018 Daan Jippes was together with Freddy Milton dedicated a volume in the Disney Masters book series from Fantagraphics Books, in the volume titled, Donald Duck: The Great Survival Test (2018) ISBN .

Since 2021 the Carl Barks' scripted Jippes finished Junior Woodchuck stories stories are being reprinted in Fantagraphics' series The Complete Carl Barks Disney Library. These stories are featured in the following volumes:

 The Complete Carl Barks Disney Library, Vol 25 - Donald Duck: Balloonatics ISBN

References

Further reading
Roger Ash. "A Gander at Gladstone." Back Issue! No. 23 (August 2007) pp. 35–41.
Geoffrey Blum. "Gladstone Profile: Daan Jippes." Walt Disney's Comics and Stories No. 607 (January 1997). 
Daan Jippes. "A Clean Case of Brainstorming." Carl Barks Library Set IX, p. 481 (June 1985).
Fred Milton. "Doing It the Barks Way." Barks Collector No. 10 (1978).

External links
 
 
 Daan Jippes at the Lambiek Comiclopedia
 Comic House portfolio of Daan Jippes

Dutch comics artists
Dutch comics writers
1945 births
Living people
Writers from Amsterdam
Disney comics writers
Disney comics artists
Walt Disney Animation Studios people
Winners of the Stripschapsprijs